The 2012–13 season was the 63rd season in which Crawley Town played senior football, and the eight as a fully professional team. Crawley Town competed in Football League One, the third tier of English football, following automatic promotion from League Two during the 2011–12 season.

Sean O'Driscoll, who was appointed Crawley manager in May 2012, left the club just two months later to manage Nottingham Forest, despite not having taken charge of a competitive game. Richie Barker succeeded as manager on 7 August 2012, after agreeing compensation with Bury.

On 5 January 2013, in their third round FA Cup tie with Premier League side Reading, Crawley had a record attendance of 5,880 at Broadfield Stadium.

Crawley finished the season in 10th place.

Table

Results

Pre-season

League One

Results

FA Cup

Football League Cup

Football League Trophy

Transfers

Transfers in
Although the list below displays a previous club column, many of the players were free agents at the time of signing. The column also refers to the clubs the players were most recently contracted to, although many of them were on loan before joining Crawley.

Loans in

Transfers out

Loaned Out

Statistics
All statistics accurate as of 7 June 2013.

Quick Stats/Facts

Top scorers

Win Percentage

References

Crawley Town F.C. seasons
Crawley Town